The men's basketball tournament at the 1975 Pan American Games was held from October 13 to October 25, 1975 in Mexico City, Mexico.

Men's competition

Participating nations

Final ranking

Awards

Women's competition

Participating nations

Final ranking

Awards

References
 Results
 basketpedya

Basketball
1975
1975–76 in North American basketball
1975–76 in South American basketball
International basketball competitions hosted by Mexico